The Common Locale Data Repository Project, often abbreviated as CLDR, is a project of the Unicode Consortium to provide locale data in XML format for use in computer applications. CLDR contains locale-specific information that an operating system will typically provide to applications.

Overview
Among the types of data that CLDR includes are the following:

 Translations for language names
 Translations for territory and country names
 Translations for currency names, including singular/plural modifications
 Translations for weekday, month, era, period of day, in full and abbreviated forms
 Translations for time zones and example cities (or similar) for time zones
 Translations for calendar fields
 Patterns for formatting/parsing dates or times of day
 Exemplar sets of characters used for writing the language
 Patterns for formatting/parsing numbers
 Rules for language-adapted collation
 Rules for spelling out numbers as words
 Rules for formatting numbers in traditional numeral systems (such as Roman and Armenian numerals)
 Rules for transliteration between scripts, much of it based on BGN/PCGN romanization

CLDR is written in LDML (Locale Data Markup Language). The information is currently used in International Components for Unicode, Apple's macOS, LibreOffice, MediaWiki, and IBM's AIX, among other applications and operating systems. CLDR overlaps somewhat with ISO/IEC 15897 (POSIX locales). POSIX locale information can be derived from CLDR by using some of CLDR's conversion tools.

CLDR is maintained by a technical committee which includes employees from IBM, Apple, Google, Microsoft, and some government-based organizations. The committee is chaired by John Emmons, of IBM; Mark Davis, of Google, is vice-chair.

The CLDR covers 400+ languages.

References

External links 
 Common Locale Data Repository, the informational webpage of the CLDR project

Unicode
Date and time representation
Internationalization and localization